Neelam Karwariya is a politician of the Bharatiya Janata Party. She won the 2017 Uttar Pradesh Legislative Assembly election from Meja, Allahabad and is a member of the 17th Uttar Pradesh Legislative Assembly.

Career
When she started campaigning for the elections, her opponents called her an outsider and this prompted her to start living in the village. She received 67,807 votes while her nearest rival, a candidate of the Samajwadi Party obtained 47,964 votes.

Personal life
She is married to former BJP's MLA Udaybhan Karwariya   and have three children together , two daughters  Samridhi Karwariya   Sakshi Karwariya and a son Saksham Karwariya

References

Living people
Uttar Pradesh MLAs 2017–2022
Bharatiya Janata Party politicians from Uttar Pradesh
Year of birth missing (living people)